Nicklas Robert Bärkroth (born 19 January 1992) is a Swedish professional footballer who plays as a winger for Örgryte. Previously, he has played for Balltorps FF, IFK Göteborg, União Leiria, IF Brommapojkarna, IFK Norrköping, Lech Poznań and Djurgårdens IF. He has won six caps for the Sweden national team.

Career

Bärkroth became the youngest player ever to play in the highest Swedish football league, Allsvenskan, at 15 years, seven months and 14 days old when he started in IFK Göteborg's match against IF Brommapojkarna on 2 September 2007. The record was previously held by Peter Dahlqvist, who was 15 years, nine months and five days when he made his debut for Örgryte IS in 1971 against IFK Norrköping, they were the only two 15-year-olds ever to play in the history of Allsvenskan, until Sead Hakšabanović in 2015.

His father, Robert Bengtsson-Bärkroth, played 239 matches in Allsvenskan with Västra Frölunda IF and Örgryte IS. On 23 July 2008 he made his UEFA Champions League debut and scored 2 goals in IFK's 4–0 win against S.S. Murata in the second leg of the first qualifying round, coming on as a substitute at half time, making him one of the youngest players to ever score in a UEFA competition.

On 19 June 2017, he signed a four-year-contract with Polish club Lech Poznań. He made his league debut for the club on 30 July 2017 in a 5–1 home victory over Piast Gliwice. He was subbed on for Maciej Makuszewski in the 63rd minute.

On 1 March 2022, Bärkroth signed with Örgryte for two seasons with an option for a third.

International career
Bärkroth represented Sweden at all youth levels.

In December 2014, he received his first senior call-up, for two friendly games against Ivory Coast and Finland and debuted in the game against Ivory Coast on 15 January 2015.

Career statistics

Club

1 Including Svenska Supercupen.

International
Appearances and goals by national team and year
As of 12 January 2017.

Honours
IFK Norrköping
 Allsvenskan: 2015
 Svenska Supercupen: 2015

Djurgårdens IF
Allsvenskan: 2019

References

External links
 
 (archive)

1992 births
Living people
Swedish footballers
Swedish expatriate footballers
IFK Göteborg players
IF Brommapojkarna players
U.D. Leiria players
IFK Norrköping players
Lech Poznań players
Djurgårdens IF Fotboll players
Örgryte IS players
Allsvenskan players
Superettan players
Primeira Liga players
Ekstraklasa players
Expatriate footballers in Portugal
Swedish expatriate sportspeople in Portugal
Expatriate footballers in Poland
Swedish expatriate sportspeople in Poland
Sweden youth international footballers
Sweden under-21 international footballers
Sweden international footballers
Footballers from Gothenburg
Association football wingers